Caldini is a surname. Notable people with the surname include:

Fulvio Caldini (born 1959), Italian composer, pianist, and musicologist, brother of Sandro
Liliana Caldini (1951–2022), Argentine model, actress, and television show host
Sandro Caldini (born 1958), Italian oboist

See also
Calzini